Alain Alfredo Cervantes O'Farrill (born November 17, 1983) is a footballer from Cuba currently playing for FC Ciego de Ávila.

Club career
The diminutive winger or attacking midfielder played his entire career for local side Ciego de Ávila.

International career
He made his international debut for Cuba in a March 2003 friendly match against Jamaica and has earned a total of 67 caps, scoring 8 goals. He represented his country in 14 FIFA World Cup qualification matches and played at 5 CONCACAF Gold Cup final tournaments.

International goals
Scores and results list Cuba's goal tally first.

References

External links
 

1983 births
Living people
People from Morón, Cuba
Cuban people of Irish descent
Association football wingers
Cuban footballers
Cuba international footballers
FC Ciego de Ávila players
2003 CONCACAF Gold Cup players
2005 CONCACAF Gold Cup players
2007 CONCACAF Gold Cup players
2011 CONCACAF Gold Cup players
2015 CONCACAF Gold Cup players